Intercapperia is a genus of moths in the family Pterophoridae containing only one species, Intercapperia scindia, which is only known from the Scinde Valley in Kashmir. Adults have been recorded from June to August.

References

External links

Oxyptilini
Monotypic moth genera
Moths of Asia